Shruti Kurien (born 28 March 1983) is an Indian badminton player. She along with partner Jwala Gutta won the National women's doubles championship in 2000 and 2002–2008. She was the gold medalists at the 2004, 2006 and 2010 South Asian Games in the women's doubles and team events, also won mixed team bronze at the 2006 Commonwealth Games. Kurien won the women's doubles Grand Prix title at 2008 Bulgaria Open. She was formerly married to Nikhil Kanetkar, another National badminton champion from Maharashtra, although the two are now divorced.

Achievements

South Asian Games 
Women's doubles

BWF Grand Prix 
The BWF Grand Prix had two levels, the BWF Grand Prix and Grand Prix Gold. It was a series of badminton tournaments sanctioned by the Badminton World Federation (BWF) which was held from 2007 to 2017.

Women's doubles

Mixed doubles

  BWF Grand Prix Gold tournament
  BWF Grand Prix tournament

BWF International Challenge/Series 
Women's doubles

Mixed doubles

  BWF International Challenge tournament
  BWF International Series tournament

References

External links
 

1983 births
Living people
Racket sportspeople from Chennai
Sportswomen from Tamil Nadu
Malayali people
21st-century Indian women
21st-century Indian people
Indian female badminton players
Indian national badminton champions
Badminton players at the 2006 Commonwealth Games
Commonwealth Games bronze medallists for India
Commonwealth Games medallists in badminton
South Asian Games gold medalists for India
South Asian Games medalists in badminton
Medallists at the 2006 Commonwealth Games